The Captain Stephen Olney House is a historic site in North Providence, Rhode Island. It is a -story wood-frame structure, five bays wide, with a pair of interior chimneys. The principal exterior decoration is in the front door surround, which features pilasters supporting an entablature and gable pediment. The house was built in 1802 by Stephen Olney, a veteran of the American Revolutionary War, on what was then a large farm. His descendants enlarged the house in the 1840s, adding an ell to the south.

The house was listed on the National Register of Historic Places in 1974.

See also
National Register of Historic Places listings in Providence County, Rhode Island

References

External links

Houses on the National Register of Historic Places in Rhode Island
Houses in Providence County, Rhode Island
Historic American Buildings Survey in Rhode Island
Buildings and structures in North Providence, Rhode Island
National Register of Historic Places in Providence County, Rhode Island